The 2020 Belarusian Athletics Championships was the national championship in outdoor track and field for Belarus. It was held from 30 July – 2 August at Dinamo Stadium in Minsk.

Results

Men

Women

Mixed

References

Results
 2020 Belarus Open National Championships Results. Belarusian Athletics Federation. Retrieved 2020-11-26.

Belarusian Athletics Championships
Belarusian Athletics Championships
Belarusian Athletics Championships
Belarusian Athletics Championships
Sports competitions in Minsk